{{DISPLAYTITLE:C19H18ClN3O5S}}
The molecular formula C19H18ClN3O5S (molar mass: 435.881 g/mol, exact mass: 435.0656 u) may refer to:

 Cloxacillin
 Rivaroxaban

Molecular formulas